NFRA may refer to:

 National Federation of Republican Assemblies
 National Financial Reporting Authority
 National Frozen & Refrigerated Foods Association